Ventura Pons Sala (born 25 July 1945, in Barcelona, Spain) is a Spanish movie director. He mainly directs films in Catalan but also in Spanish and English.  Pons has directed 32 feature films and is one of the best-known Catalan film directors. His films are continuously programmed in the most prestigious international festivals, almost 810 up to now, and distributed in many countries around the world.

He has been vice-president of the Spanish Film Academy and the subject of more than 34 international homages and retrospectives: London's ICA (Institute of Contemporary Arts), New York's Lincoln Center and in the world's foremost cinematheques, such as those in Los Angeles, Mexico, Buenos Aires, Santiago, Caracas, Belgrade, Istanbul, Warsaw, Tel-Aviv, Jerusalem, and Haifa, among many others.

Pons has also received international "Lifetime Achievement Awards" at film festivals in Chicago, Galway, Piešťany, Lima, Turin, and Montpellier.

In Spain, he has received the Catalan National Film Award, the Spanish Fine Arts Gold Medal, the Catalan Sant Jordi Cross, the Catalan Film Academy's Gaudi Honorary Award, the Ondas Award, the City of Huesca Award, the Count Jaume d’Urgell Award, and the Jordi Dauder Award, among many others.

In 2012, the University of Colorado at Denver held an academic Conference on his cinema. Vervuert has published a book about this conference: Ventura Pons: An Exceptional Gaze from the Catalan Cinema.

He has published a book of memoirs,  Mine (and the Others), written in 2011, and in 2017, he published I Have Tasted the Fruits of the Tree of Life.  He also published a world tour diary, entitled 54 Days and a Bit More in 2012.

Filmography

 2018: Be Happy!
 2018: Univers(o) Pecanins 
 2017: Miss Dalí
 2017: Universal i Faraona  ("Universal and Pharaoh")
 2016: Sabates Grosses ("The Bigger, the Better")
 2016: Oh, quina joia! ("Oh, What a Joy!")
 2015: Cola, Colita, Colassa ("Ode to Barcelona") 
 2015: El virus de la por ("Virus of Fear")
2013: Ignasi M.
2013: Un berenar a Ginebra("An afternoon at Geneva")
2011: Year of Grace ("Any de Gràcia")
2010: A Thousand fools (Mil cretins)
2009: A la deriva
2008: Strangers (Forasters)
2007: Barcelona (un mapa)
2006: Life on the Edge (La vida abismal)
2005: Wounded Animals (Animals ferits)
2004: Idiot Love (Amor idiota)
2002: El Gran Gato
2001: Food of Love (Menja d'amor)
2000: Anita Takes a Chance (Anita no perd el tren)
1999: To Die (Or Not) (Morir (o no))

1998: Beloved/Friend (Amic / Amat)
1997: Caresses (Carícies)
1996: Actresses (Actrius)
1994: What It's All About (El perquè de tot plegat)
1993: Rosita, Please!
1992: Tonight Or Never (Aquesta nit o mai)
1990: What's Your Bet, Mari Pili? (Què t'hi jugues, Mari Pili?)
1989: Dammed Misery! (Puta misèria!)
1986: The Blonde at the Bar (La rossa del bar)
1981: The Vicary of Olot (El vicari d'Olot)
1979: Informe sobre el FAGC
1978: Ocana, an Intermittent Portrait (Ocaña, retrat intermitent),

References

External links
 
 Ventura Pons website 

1945 births
Living people
People from Barcelona
Film directors from Catalonia
Spanish screenwriters
Spanish male writers
Male screenwriters